Botswana Government Gazette is the official publication of the Government of Botswana and publishes laws, ordinances and other regulations. The government gazette is printed by Government Printing and Publishing Services.

See also 

 List of government gazettes

References

External links 

 gazettes.africa/gazettes/bw/ (Unofficial: Republishes print publications)